Northeastern Volunteer Righteous and Brave Fighters was established by Wang Fengge, an officer in the Chinese Northeast Army who involved in the Big Swords Society. After the Japanese invasion of Northeast China in 1931, he raised an anti-Japanese force by linking up with other citizens in the Linjiang and Ji'an areas during late 1931. In March 1932, he announced the establishment of his army – the Northeastern Volunteer Righteous and Brave Fighters.

See also
"The March of the Volunteers", known in Chinese as "The Righteous and Brave Army March"
Japanese invasion of Manchuria
Pacification of Manchukuo
Second Sino-Japanese War

References
Coogan, Anthony, The volunteer armies of Northeast China, History Today; July 1993, Vol. 43 Issue 7, pp.36-41
Notes On A Guerrilla Campaign, from http://www.democraticunderground.com accessed November 4, 2006

Anti-Japanese Volunteer Armies
Military units and formations established in 1932